The Catholic societies of the Church of England are associations within the Church of England which follow in the tradition of Anglo-Catholicism. They may be devotional, theological or pilgrimage-focused in nature. Many trace their origins to the Catholic revival in the Church of England which started with the Oxford Movement in the 19th century.

Although many, especially the older ones, make specific reference to the Church of England in their foundation documents, the vast majority today extend their membership and influence to all member churches of the wider Anglican Communion, and often also to those non-Anglican churches that are in full communion with the See of Canterbury (for example, through the Porvoo Communion).

Origins
The various societies were founded for many different reasons. Some have specific focuses, such as an emphasis on Mariology, or on liturgical questions (including the Blessed Sacrament), supporting vocations amongst those who share Anglo-Catholic ideology, promoting study, encouraging devotion, or promoting pilgrimage to different sacred sites (especially those associated with Our Lady of Walsingham).

In the nineteenth century, many of the older societies had a role in supporting both clergy and laity who found their Anglo-Catholic practices or beliefs challenged through the civil courts by protestant organisations, as part of the then current disagreement concerning ritualism in the Church of England. Those prosecuted ranged from relatively unknown parochial clergy (such as Fr Arthur Tooth) to prominent leading churchmen of the day (such as Bishop Edward King). The Church Union is an example of a society founded to provide legal and moral support to those Anglo-Catholics persecuted for their beliefs. Today these organisations have assumed different objectives.

Ordination of women
The issue of the ordination of women in the Anglican Communion has caused disagreement amongst Anglicans, including those of the Anglo-Catholic tradition, and these differences of opinion have had repercussions for the Catholic societies. Some societies have declared that their membership is open only to male priests, or those opposed to the ordination of women. Other societies have been founded specifically to cater for those who are open to, or support, women's ordination. Some (such as the Confraternity of the Blessed Sacrament) have publicly declared that they are open to membership from those opposed to or in favour of women's ordination, but for the sake of internal unity will only permit male priests to hold office in the society, or to preside at the society's meetings and liturgies.

An umbrella organisation entitled Catholic Societies in the Church of England has been founded to unite those societies which oppose the ordination of women. This article is not about that umbrella organisation, but reflects the full range of Anglo-Catholic societies regardless of their views on women's ordination.

Current societies
The catholic societies in this table are currently active in the life of the Church of England, and (in most cases) other Anglican provinces.

Former societies
The catholic societies in this table are no longer active.

See also
Ritualism
Oxford Movement
The Society (Church of England)

References

Church of England societies and organisations
Anglo-Catholicism